Splicing factor, arginine/serine-rich 2 is a protein that in humans is encoded by the SFRS2 gene. MDS-associated splicing factor SRSF2 affects the expression of Class III and Class IV isoforms and perturbs granulopoiesis and SRSF2 P95H promotes Class IV splicing by binding to key ESE sequences in CSF3R exon 17, and that SRSF2, when mutated, contributes to dysgranulopoiesis.

Interactions 

SFRS2 has been shown to interact with CDC5L and ASF/SF2.

References

Further reading

External links